Remember Me is a 2016 American comedy film written by, directed by and starring Steve Goldbloom and featuring Rita Moreno.  It is Goldbloom's feature directorial debut.

Cast
Steve Goldbloom as Vincent Seder
Joel Kelley Dauten as Barry Sachs
Rita Moreno as Nanna/Gloria Sachs
Ray Reinhardt as Pappy/Lou Sachs
Zach Land Miller as Isaac
Corey Jackson as Marshall
Pamela Gaye Walker as Dr. Gale McInerney
Miranda Kahn as Nadine
Michael Valladares as Paul
Jeff Kazanjian as Jeff
Heidi Godt as Elisha
Melissa Locsin as Jo
Liz Kennedy as Anne
Alexander Matteson as Max
Jonathan Levine as Jason

Release
The film premiered at the Cinequest Film & Creativity Festival on March 5, 2016.

Reception
Dennis Harvey of Variety gave the film a positive review and wrote that Moreno's "unpredictable performance in an underwritten role gooses things to an amiable degree."

Sheri Linden of The Hollywood Reporter also gave the film a positive review, calling it "...a pleasing balance between sincerity and irreverence."

Kimber Myers of the Los Angeles Times gave the film a negative review and wrote, "Other than the buoyant presence of Oscar winner Rita Moreno, “Remember Me” is a charmless but harmless comedy about two cousins and their aging grandmother."

References

External links
 
 

2016 comedy films
American comedy films
2016 films
2010s English-language films
2010s American films